William Briscoe may refer to:
 Billy Briscoe (1896–1994), English footballer
 Billy Briscoe (Australian footballer) (1892–1943), Australian rules footballer
 William Briscoe (footballer) (c. 1864–?), English footballer
 William Briscoe (politician) (c. 1606–1688), MP for Carlisle

See also
Briscoe (disambiguation)